Alcohol dehydrogenase, iron containing 1 is a protein that in humans is encoded by the ADHFE1 gene.

Function 

The ADHFE1 gene encodes hydroxyacid-oxoacid transhydrogenase (EC 1.1.99.24), which is responsible for the oxidation of 4-hydroxybutyrate in mammalian tissues.

References

Further reading